The 1978 African Cup of Nations Final was a football match that took place on 16 March 1978, at the Accra Sports Stadium in Accra, Ghana, to determine the winner of the 1978 Africa Cup of Nations. Ghana defeated Uganda 2–0 with two goals from Opoku Afriyie to win their third African Cup. As of 2019, this is the only Ugandan appearance in an African Cup of Nations final.

Road to the final

Match

Details

External links
Final match details - 11v11

Final
1978
1978
1978
March 1978 sports events in Africa
20th century in Accra
1978 in Ghanaian sport